Homage to My Heroes is the ninth solo album by jazz pianist Mike Garson, and was released in 2003.

Track list

References

External links
 Homage to my heroes at CD-Baby Album track listing and reviews
 SP Mediaflash - Mike Garson Interview Garson talks about the album
 mikegarson.com Official Website with Discography

Mike Garson albums
2004 albums
Tribute albums